Maurice D. Evans (born August 14, 1988) is a former gridiron football defensive end. He was signed by the New York Giants as an undrafted free agent in 2009. He played college football at Penn State.

Evans has also been a member of the Tampa Bay Buccaneers, Carolina Panthers and Chicago Bears.

Early years
While playing for Christ The King Regional High School, Evans was a 4-star recruit by rivals.com and a First-team all state selection and was ranked the nations sixth best defensive end coming out of high school after recording 92 tackles, four sacks and four fumble recoveries as a senior. Evans was named an Army All-American as a senior and played in the U.S. Army All-American Bowl. He was heavily recruited by USC, Penn State, and Notre Dame.

College career
Evans was an immediate contributor in 2006 as a true freshman, seeing action in all 13 games. He recorded 12 tackles (7 solo), 3.5 tackles for loss and 1.5 sacks. He would be named to the First-team of the Sporting News's the All-Big Ten Freshman Team. In 2007—Evans' first starting season at defensive end—Evans recorded 12.5 sacks (including 3.5 against Indiana). He also had 54 tackles, with 21.5 tackles for loss, to go with the 12.5 sacks, broke up 3 passes in coverage, and forced 5 fumbles. He was a finalist for the Ted Hendricks Award as a sophomore.

By the start of the 2008 season Evans was had been named to numerous preseason All-American teams, including Phil Steele's All-American first-team. He was also on the 2008 Bednarik, Lombardi, and Nagurski award watchlists.

In 10 games in 2008, Evans recorded just 34 tackles, 4.5 tackles for loss, and 3 sacks. Evans elected to leave Penn State after to 2008 season and enter the NFL Draft. He trained for the NFL Scouting Combine at Power Train Sports Performance in Millersville, Pennsylvania.

Professional career

Pre-draft

New York Giants
Evans was signed as an undrafted free agent by the New York Giants after not being taken in the 2009 NFL Draft. He was waived during final cuts on September 4, 2009.

First stint with Buccaneers
Evans was claimed off waivers by the Tampa Bay Buccaneers on September 6, 2009. He was waived on September 14.

Carolina Panthers
Evans was signed to the Carolina Panthers practice squad on September 24. He was released on October 3 when defensive tackle Ra'Shon Harris was re-signed to the practice squad.

Second stint with Buccaneers
Evans was re-signed by the Tampa Bay Buccaneers on October 7, 2009. He was waived on October 10, to make room for Tanard Jackson. Evans was signed to the Buccaneers' practice squad on October 28.

He was waived on June 14, 2010.

Chicago Bears
Evans signed with the Chicago Bears on August 4, 2010.

Evans was waived by the Bears on August 30, 2010.

BC Lions
Evans signed with the BC Lions on May 1, 2012. He was released by the Lions on May 24, 2013.

Personal life
Evans has one child (Amari) with Long time Partner and girlfriend Ieisha

Evans' father Michael Evans, was stabbed to death on Christmas Eve, 1988, near the family's home in East New York, Brooklyn,

References

External links
Just Sports Stats
BC Lions bio
Carolina Panthers bio
New York Giants bio
Penn State Nittany Lions bio
Tampa Bay Buccaneers bio

1988 births
Living people
Sportspeople from Brooklyn
Players of American football from New York City
American football defensive ends
Penn State Nittany Lions football players
New York Giants players
Tampa Bay Buccaneers players
Carolina Panthers players
Chicago Bears players
BC Lions players